Philodoria is a genus of moths in the family Gracillariidae. All species are endemic to Hawaii. It was first described by Lord Walsingham in 1907.

Life history
The larvae mine the leaves of many kinds of broad-leaved plants. Some of the species pupate within the larval mines, but others emerge from their mines to pupate.

Species
Philodoria auromagnifica Walsingham, 1907
Philodoria basalis Walsingham, 1907
Philodoria costalis Swezey, 1934
Philodoria dubauticola (Swezey, 1940)
Philodoria dubautiella (Swezey, 1913)
Philodoria epibathra (Walsingham, 1907)
Philodoria floscula Walsingham, 1907
Philodoria hauicola (Swezey, 1910)
Philodoria hibiscella (Swezey, 1913)
Philodoria lipochaetaella (Swezey, 1940)
Philodoria lysimachiella Swezey, 1928
Philodoria marginestrigata (Walsingham, 1907)
Philodoria micropetala Walsingham, 1907
Philodoria molokaiensis Swezey, 1928
Philodoria naenaeiella (Swezey, 1940)
Philodoria neraudicola (Swezey, 1920)
Philodoria nigrella Walsingham, 1907
Philodoria nigrelloides (Swezey, 1946)
Philodoria pipturiana Swezey, 1923
Philodoria pipturicola Swezey, 1915
Philodoria pipturiella Swezey, 1923
Philodoria pittosporella (Swezey, 1928)
Philodoria sciallactis (Meyrick, 1928)
Philodoria spilota (Walsingham, 1907)
Philodoria splendida Walsingham, 1907
Philodoria succedanea Walsingham, 1907
Philodoria touchardiella (Swezey, 1928)
Philodoria ureraella (Swezey, 1915)
Philodoria urerana (Swezey, 1915)
Philodoria wilkesiella Swezey, 1940

References

External links

Global Taxonomic Database of Gracillariidae (Lepidoptera)

 
Gracillariinae
Endemic moths of Hawaii
Gracillarioidea genera
Taxa named by Thomas de Grey, 6th Baron Walsingham